Now I'm a Cowboy is the 1994 second album by British alternative rock band The Auteurs. On 2 June 2014 Now I'm a Cowboy was reissued alongside After Murder Park and How I Learned to Love the Bootboys. The reissue features unreleased songs and liner notes written by Luke Haines. It was released through 3 Loop Music.

In 2003, Mojo placed the album at number 40 on its list of the "Top 50 Eccentric Albums".

Track listing
All songs written by Luke Haines.
Original 1994 CD/LP (CDHUT16/HUTLPX16)
 "Lenny Valentino" – 2:20
 "Brainchild" – 3:43
 "I'm a Rich Man's Toy" – 2:54
 "New French Girlfriend" – 4:15
 "The Upper Classes" – 6:45
 "Chinese Bakery" – 3:05
 "A Sister Like You" – 2:48
 "Underground Movies" – 3:32
 "Life Classes / Life Model" – 4:02
 "Modern History" – 5:36
 "Daughter of a Child" – 2:36

Free one-sided 7" (HUTL16)
"Modern History" (acoustic version) – 3:24

2014 expanded edition disc 1 bonus tracks
 "Lenny Valentino (single version)"
 "Vacant Lot"
 "Car Crazy"
 "Disney World"
 "Lenny Valentino (original mix)"
 "Underground Movies (alternative mix)"
 "Brainchild (original version)"

2014 expanded edition disc 2
 "Government Bookstore"
 "Everything You Say Will Destroy You"
 "Chinese Bakery (acoustic)" 
 "Modern History (acoustic)"
 "Upper Classes (BBC Radio 1 evening session 1994)" 
 "Rich Man's Toy (BBC Radio 1 evening session 1994)"
 "Underground Movies (BBC Radio 1 evening session 1994)"
 "Everything You Say Will Destroy You (BBC Radio 1 evening session 1994)"
 "Lenny Valentino (Mark Radcliffe BBC Radio 1 session 1994)"
 "Chinese Bakery (Mark Radcliffe BBC Radio 1 Session 1994)" 
 "New French Girlfriend (Mark Radcliffe BBC Radio 1 session 1994)" 
 "Modern History (Mark Radcliffe BBC Radio 1 session 1994)"
 "How Could I Be Wrong (live at Leeds Town & Country 1993)"
 "Don't Trust The Stars (live at Leeds Town & Country 1993)"
 "The Upper Classes (live at Leeds Town & Country 1993)"
 "New French Girlfriend (live at Leeds Town & Country 1993)"
 "Showgirl (live at Leeds Town & Country 1993)"
 "Lenny Valentino (live at Leeds Town & Country 1993)"
 "Modern History (live at Leeds Town & Country 1993)"
 "Early Years (live at Leeds Town & Country 1993)"

Personnel
Adapted from the album booklet.
 Luke Haines – guitar, piano, vocals
 Alice Readman – bass guitar 
 James Banbury – cello, Hammond
 Barny Rockford – drums

Additional musicians
 Louise Elliot – sax
 Belinda Sykes – oboe
 Joe Beckett – percussion

Production
 Phil Vinall – producer, engineer
 Luke Haines – producer
 Pete Hoffman – assistant engineer
 Giles Hall – assistant engineer
 Stefan De Batselier – photography
 Peter Barrett – sleeve design
 Andrew Biscomb – sleeve design

References

External links

Now I'm a Cowboy at YouTube (streamed copy where licensed)

1994 albums
The Auteurs albums
Hut Records albums
Albums produced by Phil Vinall